Emanuele Abate (born 8 July 1985) is an Italian athlete competing in the 110 metres hurdles. He was born in Genoa.

Biography
In 2012 he twice improved the national record, first time in Montgeron on 13 May 2012 with 13"32, second time in Turin, on 8 June, at Memorial Primo Nebiolo, with 13"28.

National records
60 metres hurdles indoor: 7.57 (4 February 2012  Magglingen) – Until 1 March 2013
110 metres hurdles: 13.28 (8 June 2012  Turin)

Progression
110 m hurdles

Achievements

National titles
He has won the individual national championship six times.
3 wins in the 110 metres hurdles (2007, 2008, 2011)
3 wins in the 60 metres hurdles indoor (2008, 2009, 2011)

See also
 Italian records in athletics
 Italian all-time lists – 110 metres hurdles

References

External links
 

1985 births
Italian male hurdlers
Living people
Sportspeople from Genoa
Athletes (track and field) at the 2012 Summer Olympics
Olympic athletes of Italy
Athletics competitors of Fiamme Oro
Universiade medalists in athletics (track and field)
World Athletics Championships athletes for Italy
Universiade bronze medalists for Italy
Medalists at the 2009 Summer Universiade
21st-century Italian people